Woody Baron (born August 8, 1993) is an American professional gridiron football defensive lineman for the BC Lions of the Canadian Football League (CFL).

College career
Baron played college football for the Virginia Tech Hokies from 2013 to 2016. He played in 52 games, starting in 21 of them, where he had 99 tackles, nine sacks, two forced fumbles, and three fumble recoveries.

Professional career

Dallas Cowboys
Baron signed as an undrafted free agent with the Dallas Cowboys in April 2017. However, he was released at the end of training camp on September 2, 2017.

Montreal Alouettes
On March 19, 2018, Baron signed with the Montreal Alouettes. He made the team's active roster following training camp and played in his first professional game on June 16, 2018, against the BC Lions, where he had two defensive tackles. He played in all 18 regular season games in 2018 where he recorded 28 defensive tackles and four sacks.

In 2019, Baron again played in all 18 regular season games where he had 27 defensive tackles and one sack. He made his post-season debut in the team's East Semi-Final loss to the Edmonton Eskimos where he had two defensive tackles and his first career interception. He did not play in 2020 due to the cancellation of the 2020 CFL season. He played in all 14 regular season games in the shortened 2021 season where he had 16 defensive tackles and a career-high six sacks. He became a free agent upon the expiry of his contract on February 8, 2022.

BC Lions
On February 14, 2022, it was announced that Baron had signed with the BC Lions. However, his debut with the Lions was delayed due to complications following surgery for his ankle and he began the season on the six-game injured list. He played in his first game with the Lions on September 24, 2022.

Personal life
Baron's uncle, James Baron, played in 12 seasons in the Arena Football League as a defensive lineman. In August 2018, he released a children's book that he co-authored with his uncle and Henry Taylor.

References

External links
 BC Lions bio

1993 births
Living people
American football defensive linemen
BC Lions players
Canadian football defensive linemen
Dallas Cowboys players
Montreal Alouettes players
Players of American football from Chicago
Players of Canadian football from Chicago
Virginia Tech Hokies football players